RHS Garden Hyde Hall is a public display garden run by the Royal Horticultural Society in the English county of Essex. It is one of five public gardens run by the society, alongside Wisley in Surrey, Harlow Carr in North Yorkshire, Rosemoor in Devon, and Bridgewater in Greater Manchester (opening in 2021).

The 360-acre Hyde Hall site encompasses a range of garden styles, from the Dry Garden with drought resistant plants, to the Hilltop Garden with roses and herbaceous borders. Hyde Hall has had a lot of investment in recent years with the opening of a new Global Growth Vegetable Garden (in 2017) showing vegetables from around the world, a new Winter Garden (in 2018) hosting an RHS Trial of Cornus, a new Welcome building (in 2017), and Hilltop Complex (in 2018) featuring a new restaurant and activity centre.

There is a reference library, located in the old farmhouse. It provides a substantial collection of books on practical gardening, garden design, botanical art, garden history, wildlife gardening, plant hunting and much more.

Robert Brett is the current curator after taking over from Ian Le Gros who became Head of Site.

History

The garden at Hyde Hall was created by Dr and Mrs Robinson in 1955. Hyde Hall was formerly a working farm on a hilltop surrounded by arable land. The site was cleared and 60 trees purchased from Wickford market a few miles away. These trees now form the Woodland Garden.

In the 1960s shelter belts of Lawson and Leyland cypress hedges were planted. During this decade the farmland to the west of the Hyde Hall hilltop was incorporated into the garden.

In 1976 Helen and Dick Robinson formed the Hyde Hall Garden Trust which would manage the garden on a long-term basis. The trust donated Hyde Hall to the Royal Horticultural Society in 1993.

Sources
Elliott, Brent (2004). The Royal Horticultural Society: A History 1804–2004. Phillimore.

External links

 Official website

Hyde Hall
Botanical gardens in England
Gardens in Essex
Woodland gardens